Ross Allen may refer to:

Ross Allen (Australian cricketer) (born 1939), Australian cricketer
Ross Allen (Irish cricketer) (born 1996), Irish cricketer
Ross Allen (herpetologist) (1908–1981), writer from Florida, USA
Ross Allen (politician) (1928–2019), New Zealand local politician and cricket umpire